John I of Brabant, also called John the Victorious (1252/12533 May 1294) was Duke of Brabant (1267–1294), Lothier and Limburg (1288–1294). During the 13th century, John I was venerated as a folk hero. He has been painted as the perfect model of a brave, adventurous and chivalrous feudal prince.

Life

Born in Leuven, he was the son of Henry III, Duke of Brabant and Aleidis of Burgundy, daughter of Hugh IV, Duke of Burgundy. He was also an older brother of Maria of Brabant, Queen consort of Philip III of France. In 1267 his older brother Henry IV, Duke of Brabant, being mentally deficient, was deposed in his favour.

John's greatest military victory was the Battle of Worringen 1288, by which John I came to reign over the Duchy of Limburg. He was completely outnumbered in forces but led the successful invasion into the Rhineland to defeat the confederacy. In 1288 Limburg was formally attached to Brabant.

John I was said to be a model of feudal prince: brave, adventurous; excelling in every form of active exercise, fond of display, and generous in temper. He was considered one of the most gifted princes of his time. This made him very popular in Middle Ages poetry and literature. Even today there exists an ode to him, so well known that it was a potential candidate to be the North Brabant anthem. John I delighted in tournaments and was always eager to take part in jousts. He was also famous for his many illegitimate children.

On 3 May 1294 at some marriage festivities at Bar-le-Duc, John I was mortally wounded in the arm in an encounter by Pierre de Bausner. He was buried in the church of the Order of Friars Minor (Minderbroederskerk) in Brussels, but since the Protestant iconoclasm (Beeldenstorm) in 1566, nothing remains of his tomb.

Family and children

He was married twice. On 5 September 1270, he married Margaret, daughter of Louis IX of France and Margaret of Provence. They had a son, but both mother and child died shortly after his birth.

In 1273, he married Margaret (d. 3 July 1285), daughter of Guy, Count of Flanders and had the following children:

 Godfrey (1273/74 – aft. 13 September 1283).
 John II of Brabant (1275–1312).
 Margaret (4 October 127614 December 1311, Genoa), married 9 July 1292 to Henry VII, Holy Roman Emperor.
 Marie (d. after 2 December 1338), married to Count Amadeus V of Savoy.

John I had several illegitimate children:

 Gillis van der Balcht
 Jean Meuwe, Seigneur of Wavre and Dongelberg.
 Margareta of Tervuren, she was married on 2 March 1292 to Jean de Rode de Lantwyck
 Jan Pylyser (1272–1342)
 Jan van der Plasch

Legacy
The duke is remembered in the folkish song Harbalorifa that remains popular. The popular Dutch beer Hertog Jan was named after the duke. Also the beer Primus of the Haacht Brewery is named after John I (Jan Primus)

Ancestry

See also

Dukes of Brabant family tree
Hertog Jan

References

Bibliography 

 H. Barlandus, Rerum gestarum a Brabantiae ducibus historia usque in annum 1526 (Leuven, 1566)
 G. C. van der Berghe, Jean le Victorieux, duc de Brabant (1259–1294), (Leuven, 1857)
 K. F. Stallaert, Gesch. v. Jan I. van Braband en zijne tijdvak (Brussels, 1861)
 A. Wauters, Le Duc Jean Ier et le Brabant sous le règne de ce prince (Brussels, 1859)

1250s births
1294 deaths
Dukes of Brabant
House of Reginar